Motia is a village in Godda CD block in Godda subdivision of Godda district in the Indian state of Jharkhand.

Geography

Location

Overview
Rajmahal coalfield is shown in the map. The entire area is overwhelmingly rural with only small pockets of urbanisation.

Note: The full screen map is interesting. All places marked on the map are linked and you can easily move on to another page of your choice. Enlarge the map to see what else is there – one gets railway links, many more road links and so on.

Demographics
According to the 2011 Census of India, Motia had a total population of 4,746, of which 2,413 (51%) were males and 2,333 (49%) were females. Population in the age range 0–6 years was 858. The total number of literate persons in Motia was 2,521 (64.84% of the population over 6 years).

Economy
Adani Power is building a 1,600 MW thermal power plant spread across Motia, Gangta, Gayghat and other adjacent villages in Godda and Poraiyahat CD blocks. It is expected to be operational by 2022. As per a memorandum of understanding signed with Bangladesh Power Development Board, in 2016, Adanis will export the entire power generated to Bangladesh. Adanis would import coal from their Carmichael coal mine in Australia and the coal would come via Dhamra Port owned by Adani Ports & SEZ 700 km away in Odisha. In 2019, it became the first stand-alone power project to secure the status of Special economic zone. Raghubar Das, then Chief Minister of Jharkhand, felt that the Adani power plant at Godda will usher in development and progress in the tribal-domainated area. However, it is facing opposition locally for land acqusution.

Education
Government High School Motiya is a Hindi-medium coeducational institution established in 1954. It has facilities for teaching in classes IX and X.

Nirmaya Rameshwar Girls High School Motia is a Hindi-medium girls only institution established in 1981. It has facilities for teaching in classes IX and X.

References

Villages in Godda district